Nicole Collins is a contemporary Canadian artist whose work, which takes the form of painting, performance, video, and sound, explores the effect of time, accumulation, force and heat on visceral materials. She currently teaches at OCAD University.

Education
She received her Master of Visual Studies from University of Toronto in 2009
and her Bachelor of Arts, Fine Arts Major, with Honours, from University of Guelph in 1988.

Artistic career
Nicole Collins has shown her interdisciplinary work internationally, in galleries in Canada, America, Tokyo, Switzerland, and England, since the beginning of her artistic career in the early 1990s. She is currently represented by General Hardware Contemporary in Toronto, Ontario. In 2013, her and her husband Michael Davidson began an art gallery in their home living room at 26 McKenzie Crescent, Toronto.

Solo exhibitions

2018        Furthest Boundless, Koffler Gallery. Toronto, Ontario 
2006        stroke for stroke. Toronto, Ontario, Canada 
2004        Dimension. Zurich, Switzerland 
2003        branch, Wynick/Tuck Gallery. Toronto, Ontario.
2002        sample, Canadian Embassy Gallery. Tokyo, Japan. 
2001        one mark, Wynick/Tuck Gallery. Toronto, Ontario. 
2000        Path, Wynick/Tuck Gallery. Toronto, Ontario. 
1998        Given, Wynick/Tuck Gallery. Toronto, Ontario. 
1994        Blessure, Gallery 788. Toronto, Ontario. 
1994        Marked, Women’s Art Resource Centre. Toronto, Ontario.

Group exhibitions
2009        MVS Graduate Exhibition, University of Toronto Art Centre, Toronto catalogue essay by Ian Carr-Harris 
2009        start Profs, work by professors from art institutions across Canada, Studio 21, Halifax
2008        Pulse 2: Film and Painting After the Image, curated by Barbara Sternberg, Wynick/Tuck Gallery, Toronto
2008        MVS Open Studio, University of Toronto
2008        Lightening Strikes Twice, Xpace Gallery, Toronto
2008        Monkey's Paw Shelf Label Project, curated by Keri Reid and Stephen Fowler, Monkey's Paw Bookstore Toronto 
2008        House Lights Left Bright, curated by Stacey Sproule, 1478 Dundas W Toronto
2007        Hot Wax, The Rooms, St. John's Newfoundland, Canada
2007        Ann Thinghuus und?Nicole Collins, Halde Galerie, Widen, Switzerland
2006        Pulse: Abstract Painting and Film, Mount St Vincent University Gallery, curated by Ingrid Jenkner and Barbara Sternberg
2006        Whodunit? Ontario College of Art & Design fundraising auction, Toronto
2006        OCAD Drawing and Painting Endowment Collection 2006, Great Hall, Ontario College of Art & Design, Toronto.
2006        Collins Waldburger White: Wax, Minarovich Gallery, Elora Centre for the Arts.
2006        you don't wanna miss that shit, Gladstone Hotel, Toronto, curated by Katherine Mulherin
2005        Crossing the Line, The Painting Center, New York, New York
2005        informal ideas 04:05, (please press landscape), Wynick/Tuck Gallery, Toronto
2005        Whodunit? Ontario College of Art & Design fundraising auction, Toronto
2005        Advent, Halde Galerie, Widen, Switzerland
2004        Death in the Studio: Studio Death Snapshots, Book Project by Hannes Priesch + Niki Lederer, book launches in Vienna, NYC and Toronto
2004        informal ideas 04-02: landscape, Wynick/Tuck Gallery, Toronto
2004        informal ideas 04-01: (warm), Wynick/Tuck Gallery, Toronto
2004        Advent, Halde Galerie, Widen, Zurich Switzerland
2003        Motherlode, Women's Art Resource Centre, Toronto, curated by Gretchen Sankey
2003        Whodunit? Ontario College of Art & Design fundraising auction, Toronto
2003        Art with Heart, Casey House Benefit Auction, Art Gallery of Ontario, Toronto (catalogue)
2003        Advent, Halde Galerie, Widen, Zurich Switzerland
2002        Whodunit? Ontario College of Art & Design fundraising auction, Toronto
2001        Bra Joe from Kilimanjaro, University of Queensland Art Museum, Brisbane, Australia. 
2001        Paintings Painted, Platform Gallery, London UK. (www.platform.dircon.co.uk) 
2000        Translinear, Tom Thomson Gallery, Owen Sound, ON. Touring Group Exhibition (catalogue). 
2000        Translinear, Mendel Art Gallery, Saskatoon, SK. Touring Group Exhibition. (catalogue).
1999        Translinear, McMaster Museum of Art, Hamilton, ON. Touring Group Exhibition (catalogue). 
1999        Art with Heart, House Benefit Auction, Leo Kamen & Wynick/Tuck Galleries, Toronto,ON. (catalogue). 
1999        TSA 30th Anniversary Faculty Show, Art Gallery at Harbourfront, Toronto,ON. 
1999        Toronto: Under 40, Art Rental and Sales Gallery, Art Gallery of Ontario, Toronto, ON. 
1999        Art 1999  Chicago, Seventh Annual Exposition of International Galleries of Contemporary Art, May 7–11, Chicago, Illinois,USA.
1999        Informal Ideas 99.1:(Preview ’99), Wynick/Tuck Gallery, Toronto,ON. 
1998        Art with Heart, Casey House Benefit Auction, Leo Kamen & Wynick/Tuck Galleries, Toronto, ON. 
1998        Layers, Wynick/Tuck Gallery, Toronto, ON. (Summer). 
1998        Informal Ideas 98.2, 14 Degrees of Abstraction, Wynick/Tuck Gallery, Toronto, April. 
1998        Nicole Collins, Michael Davidson, Sheila Gregory, Milly Ristvedt: Painting, James Baird Gallery, St. John’s NF. May. 
1997        Art with Heart, Casey House Benefit Auction, Leo Kamen & Wynick/Tuck Galleries, Toronto, ON.(catalogue). 
1997        International Juried Exhibition of Encaustic Works, The Gallery at R&F, Kingston, New York, USA. 
1997        Colour in the Square, Wynick Tuck Gallery, Toronto,ON. 
1997        R&D (Research & Development), York Quay Gallery, Toronto,ON. 
1997        Summer Gallery Artists Exhibition, Wynick Tuck Gallery, Toronto,ON. 
1996        GLO, Archive Inc., Toronto,ON.
1996        Juicy Fruit, Art Gallery of Durham, Durham,ON. 
1995        Juicy Fruit, The Koffler Gallery, North York, Toronto,ON. (catalogue). 
1995        Art with Heart, Casey House Benefit Auction, Curator’s Choice, Linda Genereux Gallery, Toronto, ON. 
1994        Mud, 59 Adelaide East, Toronto (catalogue). 
1994        Merging XVI, Gallery 788, Toronto, ON. 
1993        Cover Me Site Specific Store-front, Installation, 488 Queen Street W., Toronto,ON. 
1993        Cabinet des Curiosites, La Chambre Blanche, Quebec City, QC.
1993        Look ’93 Annual Juried Exhibition, Gallery Lambton, Sarnia, ON. 
1992        Fleshcase Installation, Embassy Hotel, London, ON. 
1992        Roundup 92, 80 Spadina Ave, Toronto, ON.
1992        Contemporary Canadian Painting, L’Etude Ader Tajan, Paris, France. 
1991        Chambermade, Embassy Hotel, London, ON. 
1991        CKOC Annual Juried Exhibition, Art Gallery of Hamilton, Hamilton, ON. Juror’s Award. 
1991        Roundup 91, Toronto, ON.
1990        Housing; a Right, Powerplant, Toronto, ON. 
1989        University of Guelph Fine Arts Graduate 25th., Anniversary Alumni Show, MacDonald Centre, Guelph, ON.

References

Living people
Canadian women artists
Year of birth missing (living people)